Shagaya is Yoruba surname. Notable people with the surname include:

 Bola Shagaya, Nigerian transport mogul
 John Nanzip Shagaya, Nigerian senator and former senior military officer 
 Sim Shagaya, Nigerian technology entrepreneur and founder of Konga.

Yoruba-language surnames